Bald Prairie is an unincorporated community in Robertson County, in the U.S. state of Texas.

History
Bald Prairie was founded in 1865, and named the wide prairies surrounding the original town site. A post office was established at Bald Prairie in 1875, and remained in operation until it was discontinued in 1950.

References

Unincorporated communities in Robertson County, Texas
Unincorporated communities in Texas